Asplenium congestum is a species of fern in the family Aspleniaceae. It is endemic to Ecuador.  Its natural habitats are subtropical or tropical moist lowland forests and subtropical or tropical moist montane forests. It is threatened by habitat loss for agriculture.

References

congestum
Ferns of Ecuador
Endemic flora of Ecuador
Ferns of the Americas
Data deficient plants
Taxonomy articles created by Polbot